Dismorphia zathoe, the zathoe mimic white is a butterfly in the family Pieridae. The species was first described by William Chapman Hewitson in 1858. It is found in Central America and northern South America.

The larvae feed on Inga species, including I. densiflora and I. venusta.

Subspecies
The following subspecies are recognised:
D. z. zathoe (Colombia)
D. z. core (C. Felder & R. Felder, 1861) (Venezuela)
D. z. othoe (Hewitson, 1867) (Ecuador, Colombia)
D. z. pallidula Butler & H. Druce, 1874 (Costa Rica, Panama)
D. z. proserpina Grose-Smith & Kirby, 1897 (Guyana)
D. z. demeter Röber, 1909 (Colombia)

Gallery

References

Dismorphiinae
Butterflies of Central America
Pieridae of South America
Lepidoptera of Colombia
Lepidoptera of Ecuador
Fauna of the Amazon
Butterflies described in 1858